Ergodic Ramsey theory is a branch of mathematics where problems motivated by additive combinatorics are proven using ergodic theory.

History
Ergodic Ramsey theory arose shortly after Endre Szemerédi's proof that a set of positive upper density contains arbitrarily long arithmetic progressions, when Hillel Furstenberg gave a new proof of this theorem using ergodic theory. It has since produced combinatorial results, some of which have yet to be obtained by other means, and has also given a deeper understanding of the structure of measure-preserving dynamical systems.

Szemerédi's theorem

Szemerédi's theorem is a result in arithmetic combinatorics, concerning arithmetic progressions in subsets of the integers. In 1936, Erdős and Turán conjectured that every set of integers A with positive natural density contains a k term arithmetic progression for every k. This conjecture, which became Szemerédi's theorem, generalizes the statement of van der Waerden's theorem. Hillel Furstenberg proved the theorem using ergodic principles in 1977.

See also
 IP set
 Piecewise syndetic set
 Ramsey theory
 Syndetic set
 Thick set

References
Ergodic Methods in Additive Combinatorics
Vitaly Bergelson (1996) Ergodic Ramsey Theory -an update

Sources

Ergodic theory
Ramsey theory